Houliston may refer to:

 Billy Houliston, Scottish footballer 
 Houliston Glacier in Antarctica